Jason Marcy is a cartoonist living in Hamilton, Ontario who works primarily in the field of autobiographical comics. His series of Jay's Days books recount his days working for a record store chain and later in a pasta shop, and delve into his relationships with his friends, co-workers, and family members.

He began his comics career with a series of mini-comics titles, beginning with Gavin, then Powerwus and Tales from the Petro-Canada Man, the latter of which began his work in autobiographical cartooning.

Inspired by the work of James Kochalka, Marcy keeps a daily cartoon diary that is linked from his website.

External links 
 
 Newsarama Interview
 Comic Book Galaxy interview
 Five Questions for Jason

Canadian comics artists
Canadian comics writers
Canadian cartoonists
Living people
Year of birth missing (living people)